was a Japanese female idol group, and a subgroup of Japanese female idol group AKB48. Under Pony Canyon, the group debuted in January 2009 with the double A-side single "Hatsukoi Dash/Aoi Mirai."

History
In October 2008, Yasushi Akimoto announced that he was going to revive the 1980s girl group Ushirogami Hikaretai, using four members of AKB48 and was renaming the group to Watarirouka Hashiritai. The group debuted under Pony Canyon releasing a double A-side single, "Hatsukoi Dash/Aoi Mirai" in January 2009. The single entered the Oricon single chart at number ten. In April the group released their second single, "Yaruki Hanabi" which charted at number nine.

In November 2009, the group released their third single "Kanpeki Gū no ne" which was used as the ending theme song for the anime version of the manga Fairy Tail.  This single had more success than the other two singles, as it sold over 23,200 copies in its first week and charted at number seven. In February 2010, Ayaka Kikuchi joined the group changing the roster from four members to five.

Their first single in 2010, "AkKanbe Bashi," reached number 1 on Oricon charts.

On June 30, 2010, two members from AKB48, Misaki Iwasa and Mika Komori, were added to Watarirouka Hashiritai to form "Watarirouka Hashiritai7", but the name applied to their "radio-only" activities, as two singles released on and after June 30 were under the name of "Watarirouka Hashiritai", not as "7" since two newcomers were not included. They eventually debuted as "7" with a single "Valentine Kiss", a cover version of Sayuri Kokushō's single, originally written by Yasushi Akimoto and released 25 years ago.

Natsumi Hirajima announced on the group's official blog that a new single will be released by "Watarirouka Hashiritai 7" on August 3, 2011. Kikuchi Ayaka announced on July 4, 2011 that the title of the song is "Hetappi Wink". Both Natsumi Hirajima and Kikuchi Ayaka described it as "a summer-ish, energetic and bright song". This will be the second time a single is released with the "7" in the group's name.

On June 25, 2012, Watarirouka Hashiritai 7 took part in Yubi Matsuri, an idol festival produced by Rino Sashihara from AKB48. The concert was held at Nippon Budokan before a crowd of 8,000 people and featured such girl groups as Idoling!!!, Shiritsu Ebisu Chugaku, Super Girls, Tokyo Girls' Style, Nogizaka46, Passpo, Buono!, and Momoiro Clover Z.

On August 24, 2012, during the AKB48 in TOKYO DOME ~1830m no Yume~ concert tour members Aika Ota and Haruka Nakagawa were transferred to HKT48 and JKT48 respectively.

On November 13, 2013, it was revealed that the group will disband on Christmas and at the same time, release a best-of album.

On February 9, 2014, their final concert was held at ZeppDiver City, Tokyo.

Members
  (JKT48 member on February 9, 2014)
 
 
  (HKT48 member on February 9, 2014)
  (Watarirouka Hashiritai 7)
  (Watarirouka Hashiritai 7)

Provisional member

  (Former AKB48 Team B member, SDN48 member) on March 10, 2012

Former Member

Discography

Albums

Singles

References

External links
  Watarirouka Hashiritai Official Site
  Watarirouka Hashiritai Official Blog
 

AKB48 sub-units
Japanese girl groups
Japanese idol groups
Musical groups established in 2009
Musical groups disestablished in 2013
Pony Canyon artists
Japanese pop music groups
2008 establishments in Japan
Musical groups from Tokyo